FC Khopyor Balashov is a Russian football team from Balashov. It played professionally from 2000 to 2002 in the Russian Second Division. Their best result was 14th place in Zone Povolzhye in 2001.

External links
  Team history by footballfacts

Association football clubs established in 1993
Football clubs in Russia
Sport in Saratov Oblast
1993 establishments in Russia